Hanrahan is an Irish surname shared by many Irish people and descendants of Irish emigrants. The name is most common in the area of the Shannon Estuary (counties Kerry, Limerick and Clare) in Ireland. Through emigration the name has become fairly common in the US, the UK and other countries to which the Irish emigrated. Many famous people share this name as well. The name was originally spelled "hAnnracháin" and initially used in the Irish province of Leinster, where local nobles and kings with the name ruled. Variations include Hanradhan and Hanraghan. Many families within Ireland and those of emigrants from Ireland, of the Ó hAnnracháin family, Anglicised their names to "O'Hanrahan" or "Hanrahan". Eochaidh, King of Leinster, an early monarch who fled to Scotland in exile in 540, was the first ruler to bear the surname. The name originates from Anradhán, diminutive of the Old Irish word "ánradh", which translates as "warrior".

Famous people with the name

Hanrahan

People
Barbara Hanrahan, Australian artist and writer
Barry Hanrahan, American Assistant General Manager, Philadelphia Flyers NHL Hockey Team
Bill Hanrahan, American announcer for NBC Nightly News, d. 1996
Brian Hanrahan, British-born BBC News correspondent, d. 2010
Edmond M. Hanrahan, American former Securities and Exchange Commission chairman
Edward Hanrahan, American State's Attorney for Illinois
Emerald O'Hanrahan British Actress starred in the hit radio show The archers
Hugh Hanrahan, Canadian House of Commons member, d. 1999
Jack Hanrahan, American comedic writer, d. 2008
Jake Hanrahan, British-born conflict journalist and documentary filmmaker.
James Hanrahan, American founder of St. Thomas More school and coach
JJ Hanrahan, Irish professional rugby player
Joe Hanrahan, Irish footballer
Joel Hanrahan, American baseball player with the Boston Red Sox
John Hanrahan, American politician
Kevin Hanrahan, American mobster, d. 1992
Kieran Hanrahan, Irish musician and radio host
Kip Hanrahan, Irish-American jazz musician
Liam Hanrahan, English professional boxer
Maura Hanrahan, Canadian author
Michael Hanrahan, American politician
Michael O'Hanrahan, Irish rebel leader executed by firing squad by the British during the 1916 Rising
Mike Hanrahan, Ireland Songwriter and former lead singer Stockton's Wing
Milo Yiannopoulos (born Milo Hanrahan), British journalist
Noelle Hanrahan, American director for Prison Radio, noted for recording Mumia Abu-Jamal's
Will Hanrahan, British TV Producer and Presenter
Pegeen Hanrahan, American mayor of Gainesville, Florida
Pat Hanrahan, American professor at Stanford University
Peter Hanrahan, Irish footballer
Robb Hanrahan, former news anchor
Robert Hanrahan, Australian musician
Robert P. Hanrahan, former U. S. representative
Will Hanrahan, British-born television personality

In fiction
Owen Red Hanrahan, fictional character who appears in several works by William Butler Yeats
Peter "Red" Hanrahan, character in Dragonriders of Pern
Peter O'Hanraha-hanrahan, news economic correspondent in The Day Today
Sorka Hanrahan, character in Dragonriders of Pern
Timothy P. Hanrahan, the real name of the fictional character Blowtorch from the G.I. Joe franchise
Tommy Hanrahan, a hockey goalie in Slap Shot who gets goaded into a fight after Reg Dulop calls his wife a dyke

hAnnracháin
Neasa Ní hAnnrachain, Irish actress
Tadhg Ó hAnnracháin, Irish author

Hanrahan in other media

Poetry
Said Hanrahan – a poem by Australian poet John O'Brien

See also
Handrahan

References

External links
Hanrahan at the House of Names
John Hanrahan's genealogy of the Hanrahan family
The Hanrahan Game

Anglicised Irish-language surnames
Septs of the Dál gCais